Summit rail station or Summit railway station may refer to:

 Summit railway station, Wellington Region), a former railway station in New Zealand
 Summit Tank railway station, a railway station in New South Wales, Australia
 Summit station (Illinois), a rail station in Illinois, United States
 Summit tram stop, a railway station in Wales, United Kingdom
 Summit railway station (India), a railway station in Maharashtra, India
 Summit station (NJ Transit), a rail station in New Jersey, United States
 Snaefell Summit railway station, a railway station on the Isle of Man
 Summit railway station (Snowdon Mountain Railway), a railway station in Wales, United Kingdom
 The Summit railway station, a railway station in Queensland, Australia